The Ann Arbor Art Fair is a group of four award-winning, not-for-profit United States art fairs that take place annually in Ann Arbor, Michigan. Over 400,000 visitors attend the fairs each year. Prior to 2016, the fair ran Wednesday through Saturday, generally the third weekend in July. Beginning in 2016, the days shifted to Thursday through Sunday.  There'll be no event in 2020 as the COVID-19 pandemic was to blame; those will return in 2021.

The four official fairs are The Ann Arbor Street Art Fair, the Original; the State Street Art Fair; the Ann Arbor Summer Art Fair; and Ann Arbor's South University Art Fair. 

In addition to art exhibits, the fairs feature music performances, demonstrations and interactive art activities.

The fairs

Ann Arbor Street Art Fair, The Original
The oldest of the four, the Ann Arbor Street Art Fair, The Original, was established in 1960 by a collaboration between the South University Businessmen's Association, Ann Arbor Art Association, and the Chamber of Commerce. Originally the Art Association did not believe artist would want their work to be displayed in the street stating, “No good artist will sit in the street.”  That proved not to be true. The first fair attracted only 132 artists, 99 of them being local, by the third annual fair there were 220 artists.  It was the first fair to jury an outdoor show in 1965 and in 2000 was a partner organization involved in the creation of the online jurying system Zapplication, now in use by hundreds of fairs across the country. 

The fair has initiated events like the Townie Street Party, a free kick off event taking place the Monday before the start of the fairs and gives the community a chance to celebrate the art fairs before the crowds come to town. The Dart for Art is a timed one-mile race featuring competitive elite runners followed by a community race and held in conjunction with the Townie Street Party. Other programs like the Youth Art Fair give young artists the opportunity to exhibit and sell their work.

The Fountain Stage presents music and dance by local community groups and professionals.

The Original Street Art Fair has won many awards over the years, including the Governors Award (State of Michigan), several Reader's Choice Awards (Ann Arbor News, Ann Arbor Current), a Gold Pinnacle Award (International Festivals and Events Association), and was named one of the Top Ten Art Fairs in the Country in a USAToday Readers Poll. The Original Fair continues to rank as one of the top fairs in industry publications like Art Fair Source Book, Sunshine Arts Magazine, and ArtFairCalendar.com.In 2003, the Ann Arbor Street Art Fair, the Original relocated to North University, East Washington and the University of Michigan's Ingall's Mall; surrounding the landmark Burton Memorial Tower.

Ann Arbor State Street Art Fair
In 1967, the merchants in the State Street District decided they would follow the Street Art Fair and have an art fair in their neighborhood. At the time, the State Street Area Association used its own resources and personnel to run the fair. This operation continues today.

Ann Arbor Summer Art Fair
The Ann Arbor Summer Art Fair takes place in two locations, State Street from Madison to William, and along Main Street and Liberty to Fifth Avenue. Produced by The Guild of Artists & Artisans, a non-profit artist membership organization, it features 375 jury selected artists.

It all began in the spring of 1970, about ten years following the premiere of the original Ann Arbor Street Fair. A group of young artists from Ann Arbor began working on a separate art fair which would give emerging artists, craftspeople and art students a chance to “take to the streets.” Calling it the Free Arts Festival, they set up this “free fair” on the University of Michigan's “Diag” on Central Campus. Funding and management for this new fair was provided by the participating artists themselves. As these young artists matured so did the Free Arts Festival, which became an official member of the Ann Arbor Art Fair and in the mid-70s was renamed the Ann Arbor Summer Art Fair.

At the same time, this group of the emerging artists realized both the need for and the potential of an artist membership organization and established The Guild out of the loose-knit organization which had form to support the “free fair.” Today The Guild of Artists & Artisans is recognized as one of the largest membership organizations of professional artists in North America. Members of the organization continue to provide leadership for all Guild fairs and programs.

Ann Arbor South University Art Fair
The Ann Arbor South University Art Fair is nationally recognized as a fine arts and crafts fair.

Unofficial Fairs
Over the years, several unofficial, for-profit art fairs have piggybacked onto the Ann Arbor Art Fairs in an attempt to capitalize on its large attendance. One such fair is operated downtown in a privately owned parking lot off Liberty Street, directly adjacent to the State Street Area Art Fair. In 2009, another for-profit art fair, Ann Arbor Art Fair at Briarwood, began in the parking lot of Briarwood Mall, a staging area for shuttle buses that travel to and from downtown Ann Arbor during the Ann Arbor Art Fairs.

Art Fair Food
The usual fair food is offered such as French fries, cotton candy, funnel fries, caramel apples and fried Twinkies. However certain vendors also offer a variety of specialized cuisine from restaurants across the city.

Protest from residents
Given the traffic disruption and the inconvenience of having a large number of visitors come in for the week, many Ann Arbor residents dislike the fairs and have protested against them, rallying under the slogan of "It's not art, and it's not fair." In 2005, in an effort to cultivate a better relationship with locals, the Ann Arbor Street Art Fair, the  Original started a tradition of holding a "Townie Street Party" on the Monday before the fairs begin.

See also
Ann Arbor, Michigan
Culture in Ann Arbor, Michigan

References

External links

 Ann Arbor Street Art Fair, The Original
 Ann Arbor Summer Art Fair
 Ann Arbor State Street Art Fair
 Ann Arbor South U Area Art Fair

Culture of Ann Arbor, Michigan
Festivals in Michigan
Art festivals in the United States
Tourist attractions in Ann Arbor, Michigan
Art fairs